Bergüenda is a town located in the municipality of Lantaron province of Álava (Araba), in the autonomous community of Basque Country, northern Spain.

External links
 BERGÜENDA in the Bernardo Estornés Lasa - Auñamendi Encyclopedia (Euskomedia Fundazioa) 

Populated places in Álava